A missile turret is a device used to aim missiles towards their targets before launch. Similarly to gun turrets they have been used on warships and vehicles on the ground. In most roles articulated missile launching systems on warships have been replaced by vertical launching systems. Ship-based missile systems often have centralised guidance systems which eliminate the need for targeting sensors on the turrets themselves.

Examples 
Aboard ships:
Some Close-in weapon systems, like the Rolling Airframe Missile and the Crotale missile systems.
Mk 10 GMLS for the RIM-67 Standard or RIM-2 Terrier missile
Mk 12 GMLS for the RIM-8 Talos missile
Mk 13 missile launcher
Mk 26 launcher for the RIM-66 Standard or RIM-24 Tartar missile
On land:
Air Defense Anti-Tank System
MIM-72/M48 Chaparral
Roland (air defence)

Combined type 
These are some weapon system that use a single turret for mounting a combination of guns and missiles:
CADS-N-1 Kashtan, a Russian naval air defense system
Tunguska-M1 Russia anti-air vehicle

See also
List of United States Navy Guided Missile Launching Systems
Transporter erector launcher

External links 
Information on some launch systems, turreted and otherwise

Weapon turrets
Rocket launchers
Missile launchers